Homonoea longimana is a species of beetle in the family Cerambycidae. It was described by Westwood in 1822. It is known from Borneo and the Philippines.

References

Homonoeini
Beetles described in 1822